"Origin of Love" is a song by the British singer and songwriter Mika. It was released as the second single in the United Kingdom from his third studio album, The Origin of Love (2012). It was written by Mika, Nick Littlemore and Paul Steel and produced by Nick Littlemore, Greg Wells and Mika. The single was released on British radio on 3 December 2012 and its music video was posted on 15 September 2012 on YouTube and Vimeo.

Track listing
 Standard edition
 "Origin of Love" – 4:37

 The Origin of Love Italian Deluxe Edition Bonus Disc
 "Origin of Love" – 4:37
 "Origin of Love" (Acoustic version) – 4:37
 "Origin of Love" (Italian version) – 4:37

Music video
The music video, sometimes referred to as "The Origin of Love" short film, was recorded in the streets of Santiago, Chile. It starred Chilean actors Daniela Ramírez and Jorge Arecheta,. It was directed by Mika and the Chilean director Cristián Jiménez, who provide a visual accompaniment to the title track. The music video for the original version of the track was originally premiered on 15 September 2012. It had explicit scenes of a man and a woman engaging in sex, whilst in a loving relationship. The video was shown on British music channels, but these scenes were edited out, replacing the original version of the track with the radio version. The video received very positive reviews from Sam Lansky, of Idolator and Perez Hilton.

Charts

Peak positions

References

Mika (singer) songs
2013 singles
2012 songs
Songs written by Mika (singer)
Songs written by Nick Littlemore
Casablanca Records singles
Barclay (record label) singles
Song recordings produced by Greg Wells